The Ben Youssef Madrasa (also transliterated as Bin Yusuf or Ibn Yusuf Madrasa) is an Islamic madrasa (college) in Marrakesh, Morocco. Functioning today as a historical site, the Ben Youssef Madrasa was the largest Islamic college in Morocco at its height. The madrasa is named after the adjacent Ben Youssef Mosque founded by the Almoravid Sultan Ali ibn Yusuf (reigned 1106-1142). The madrasa building which stands today was commissioned by the Sa'di (or Saadian) Sultan Abdallah al-Ghalib in the 16th century, following a style established during the earlier Marinid period.

History 

The madrasa is named after the adjacent Ben Youssef Mosque, which was originally the main mosque of the city, founded by the Almoravid Sultan Ali ibn Yusuf (reigned 1106-1142 ad.) The first madrasa on this site was founded during the Marinid Islamic dynasty by Sultan Abu al-Hasan (ruled 1331-1348). This dynasty, known for its perpetuation of the arts and literature, ruled from 1196 to 1465 AD and was responsible for constructing many madrasas across Morocco. The current building, however, was constructed by the Saadian Sultan Abdallah al-Ghalib (reign 1557-1574 AD), a major builder of his period, and completed in 1564-65 AD (972 AH).

Historically, madrasas have served as a center for learning, worship and community interaction. In addition to teaching Quranic Tasfeer and Islamic jurisprudence, Islamic schools often taught a wide variety of subjects, including literature, science and history. The Ben Youssef Madrasa, in fulfilling these functions, was also one of the largest theological colleges in North Africa, reportedly able to accommodate upwards of 800 students. 

Closed down in 1960, the building was refurbished and reopened to the public as a historical site in 1982. The Ben Youssef Madrasa currently attracts thousands of tourists every year and remains one of the most important historical buildings in Marrakesh. It closed for restoration again in November 2018 and reopened to the public in April 2022.

Architecture

Layout 
The madrasa's floor plan occupies a nearly square space measuring approximately 40 by 43 meters. The building is entered from a single street entrance, from which a narrow corridor leads to a vestibule chamber, which in turn gives access to the central courtyard. This process of entry, like in many Islamic buildings, is carefully designed to inspire revelation and astonishment in an unexpected opening of space into the main courtyard. The layout of the building centers around the main courtyard, which is surrounded by east and west galleries and student dormitories on the upper and lower levels. Like many Islamic buildings, the courtyard is itself centered around a large shallow reflective pool, measuring approximately 3 by 7 meters. At the southeastern end of the courtyard is another large chamber which served as a prayer hall, equipped with a mihrab (niche symbolizing the direction of prayer) featuring especially rich stucco decoration.

As in classic Marinid madrasas constructed during the century, the layout of the Ben Youssef madrasa contains student dormitory cells clustered around the first and second levels of the central courtyard. The madrasa's vestibule chamber gives access to two secondary corridors that circulate around the courtyard to give access to the dormitories on the ground floor, while two stairways from the vestibule give access to similar corridors on the second level. The dorm rooms are additionally arranged around a series of six small courtyards (three in the northeast wing, three in the southwest wing) which open on both levels from these corridors. Together, the madrasa consisted of 130 student rooms and housed up to 800 students; making it the largest madrasa in Morocco. 

On the ground floor, the eastern corridor from the vestibule also gives access to an ablutions chamber in the northeastern corner of the building. The chamber has a square floor plan with four marble columns upholding four arches below a central cupola of muqarnas (similar to the one in front of the madrasa's entrance). The middle of the chamber is occupied by a square water basin, while a series of latrine rooms are accessible around the chamber's perimeter. Notably, it was also in this chamber that an 11th-century marble basin from Cordoba was first noted by Jean Gallotti (a historical arts inspector working for the French Protectorate) in 1921. The basin was removed for study and is now housed at the Dar Si Said Museum.

Ornamentation 
The ornamentation of the Ben Youssef Madrasa derives closely from that of earlier Moroccan and Andalusian architecture, which makes use of pools, gardens, fountains, and surfaces covered in zellij (mosaic tilework) and intricately carved stucco and wood. In particular, the decorative arrangement follows the architectural traditions established in earlier Marinid madrasas: zellij tiling is used along lower walls, calligraphic friezes are generally present at eye-level, and the middle and upper areas of the walls are covered in stucco decoration before transitioning into wooden elements, including ornately-carved eaves. The arches of the ground-floor galleries in the courtyard also have stucco consoles supporting carved wooden lintels that bridge the distances between each pier. The main central courtyard of the madrasa communicates a strong visual experience for visitors and students via these embellishing elements and their symmetrical arrangement. This courtyard is entered from the vestibule via a wooden screen (mashrabiyya) under a monumental archway which is itself decorated with carved stucco. Although the student cells that surround the courtyard have little to no interior decorative elements, the small secondary courtyards that grant access to them do bear some stucco and wooden decoration. The motifs carved into wood and stucco include traditional elements such as arabesques, sebka (or dark wa ktaf), calligraphic inscriptions, and muqarnas, as well as more distinctly Saadian-era motifs such as pine cones.

The street entrance of the madrasa is overlooked by an elaborate muqarnas (stalactite or honeycomb-like sculpting) cupola in front of the doorway, while another muqarnas cupola is found in the ablutions chamber. The doors of the madrasa are plated with bronze forming an interlacing geometric pattern and enhanced with shallow carved arabesque motifs. The cedar wood lintel above the doors is carved with an Arabic inscription on an arabesque background. The inscription names and praises Sultan Abdallah as the builder of the madrasa. Numerous other inscriptions are also found throughout the building on various surfaces, often consisting of Qur'anic verses. The large Kufic inscription around the arch of the mihrab, for example, includes the basmala and the tasliyya followed by verse 36 and the beginning of verse 37 from the Surah an-Nur.

See also

Bou Inania Madrasa in Fes
Bou Inania Madrasa (Meknes) 
Shrob ou shouf fountain
El Badi Palace
Saadian Tombs

References

External links 

 Photos inside the madrasa (English)
 National Geographic 2016 Photo of the year, category "Cities"
 Photos of Ben Youssef Madrasa at the Manar al-Athar photo archive

Religious buildings and structures completed in 1565
Buildings and structures in Marrakesh
Madrasas in Morocco
Islamic universities and colleges
Saadian architecture
14th-century establishments in Morocco
Tourist attractions in Marrakesh
14th-century madrasas
16th-century madrasas